Incognito: The Secret Lives of the Brain is a 2011 New York Times best-selling nonfiction book by American neuroscientist David Eagleman, an adjunct professor at Stanford University. The book explores the juxtaposition of the conscious mind and the unconscious mind, with Eagleman summing up the text's themes with the question: "If the conscious mind—the part you consider to be you—is just the tip of the iceberg, what is the rest doing?"

In Incognito, Eagleman contends that most of the operations of the brain are inaccessible to awareness, such that the conscious mind "is like a stowaway on a transatlantic steam ship, taking credit for the journey without acknowledging the massive engineering underfoot."

Incognito appeared on the New York Times best-sellers list intermittently in 2011 and 2012. It was named a Best Book of 2011 by Amazon, the Boston Globe, and the Houston Chronicle.

The book was reviewed as "appealing and persuasive" by the Wall Street Journal and "a shining example of lucid and easy-to-grasp science writing" by The Independent. A starred review from Kirkus Reviews described it as "a book that will leave you looking at yourself—and the world—differently."

In July 2011, Eagleman discussed Incognito with Stephen Colbert on the Colbert Report.

References

External links
 Incognito website
 David Eagleman's laboratory website
 'Incognito': What's Hiding in the Unconscious Mind, NPR's Fresh Air with Terry Gross, Interview with David Eagleman, May 31, 2011.

2011 non-fiction books
Neuroscience books
Popular science books
Cognitive science literature
Pantheon Books books
Canongate Books books